Marianna Némethová-Krajčírová (born 1 June 1948) is a Slovak former gymnast. She competed in the 1964, 1968 and 1972 Summer Olympics and won silver medal in the team events in 1964 and 1968. Individually, her best achievement was fourth place on the vault in 1968.

She was born in Košice, but her family soon moved to Bratislava. She took gymnastics because of her father, a former gymnastics coach. After retirement from competitions she became a coach herself, and later an honorary member of Slovak Gymnastics Federation. She lives in Italy.

References

1948 births
Living people
Slovak female artistic gymnasts
Olympic gymnasts of Czechoslovakia
Gymnasts at the 1964 Summer Olympics
Gymnasts at the 1968 Summer Olympics
Gymnasts at the 1972 Summer Olympics
Olympic silver medalists for Czechoslovakia
Olympic medalists in gymnastics
Sportspeople from Košice

Medalists at the 1968 Summer Olympics
Medalists at the 1964 Summer Olympics
Medalists at the World Artistic Gymnastics Championships